Antipov is a Russian masculine surname, its feminine counterpart is Antipova. The surname is derived from the male given name Antip and literally means Antip's. It may refer to:

 Aleksandras Antipovas (born 1955), Lithuanian runner
 Anton Antipov (bodybuilder) (born 1983), American bodybuilder and model of Belarusian descent
 Anton Antipov (born 1990), Russian football player
 Artyom Antipov  1988 || Russian football player
 Dmitry Antipov  1984 || Russian water polo player
 Evgenia Antipova (1917–2009), Russian painter
 Ivan Antipov (born 1980), Brazilian Operations Manager
 Julia Antipova (born 1997), Russian pair skater
 Marina Antipova (born 1992), Russian ice dancer
 Nikita Antipov (born 1997), Russian football player
 Sergei Antipov (born 1974), Kazakhstani ice hockey player
 Sergey Antipov ||data-sort-value="1970"|fl. 1970 || Soviet canoer 
 Svetlana Antipova (born 1966), Russian basketball player
 Tetyana Tereshchuk-Antipova (born 1969), Ukrainian hurdler
 Vadym Antipov (born 1988), Ukrainian football player
 Vladimir Antipov (born 1978), Russian ice hockey player
 Yuliya Antipova (born 1966), Soviet luger

Russian-language surnames